The 1954 Washington State Cougars football team was an American football team that represented Washington State College during the 1954 college football season. Led by third-year head coach Al Kircher, the team was 4–6 overall and 3–4 in the Pacific Coast Conference. Three home games were played on campus in Pullman at Rogers Field, with one in Spokane in late September.

The Cougars defeated rival Washington for the second straight year, but were shut out at home by neighbor Idaho in the Battle of the Palouse, which was the Vandals' first win in the series in 29 years, since their three-peat in 1925.

The Washington rivalry game (now the Apple Cup) was held in Pullman for the first time since 1948 and was the last until 1982; all three were Cougar victories. Of the fifteen games played in Spokane from 1950 through 1980, Washington State won only three (1958, 1968, 1972), while winning five times in Seattle.

Schedule

NFL Draft
Four Cougars were selected in the 1955 NFL Draft, which was thirty rounds (360 selections).

References

External links
 Game program: Oregon State at WSC – October 9, 1954
 Game program: Idaho at WSC – October 23, 1954
 Game program: Washington at WSC – November 20, 1954

Washington State
Washington State Cougars football seasons
Washington State Cougars football